A button pusher (Knopkodav) is a term in Ukrainian politics and society related to a member of the Verkhovna Rada of Ukraine (the parliament of Ukraine) who votes on a motion by using their own identity card as well as ones belonging to the others deputies . This voting is done either with or without the consent of the absent deputies.

On 2 March 2021, sensor technologies were installed in the Ukrainian parliament that were designed to make it impossible for MP's to vote on behalf of absent colleagues (since they need now to use both their hands for a single vote).

Etymology 
The term "button pusher" emerged in the early 2000s in a journalistic environment for designation MPs who vote for their colleagues.

Other names for this phenomenon are "vote in the dark", "truant voting", "multiple voting", "vote for himself and for the other guy", "piano voting", "pianism".

The participants of "button pushing" are MPs"button pushers" who vote alien card, as well as those that provide for voting card or duplicate card to "button pusher".

Description 
If unable to attend the legislature personally, a deputy might give his or her personal voting card to a fellow deputy. Alternately, duplicate cards might be issued without the knowledge of their supposed "owner".

If voting for a neighbor, the "button pusher" inserts the card for the e-voting system "Rada" received from the missing deputy of the card, preferably not getting up, openly or secretly (hand covering newspapers, magazines, or other method) pushes the button to vote for or against the measure.

If voting for several deputies, the pusher moves from one seat to the next with multiple voting cards and pushes the buttons the same way. One such button pusher was found to have voted on average for 9.8 missing persons. Often when the absolute majority of 226 deputies was required, the button pushers were responsible for 35-40 votes.

Before the start of every session of the parliament, deputies have to register personally with their people's deputy cards and personal signatures. The deputies should also register via the parliamentary electronic system at the session hall, and thus other people will be unable to register in place of deputies.

History
The peak of "button pushing" was reached in the 6th convocation (2007–2012) at the initiative and organizational support leadership factions ruling majority - Party of Regions and Communist Party of Ukraine. According to NGO Chesno, only one lawmaker during this convocation of the Verkhovna Rada never resorted to piano voting — the other 449 all did. Tactics were quick voting when the current favorable government decisions taken quickly, without discussion or almost without discussion, often in the evening or at night by pressing of the team of "button pushers" in 35-40 MPs. Party of Regions faction leadership commits MPs to vote for other members. Before the vote, the responsible persons of the faction of the Party of Regions deputies dealt another card. Defending the practice of non personal voting, representatives of the ruling majority called it "delegation of authority". Party of Regions and the Communist Party of Ukraine together against criminal liability for "button pushing".

In 2008 sensor technologies were installed (through an initiative by then Parliamentary Speaker Arseniy Yatsenyuk) in the Ukrainian parliament that were designed to make it impossible for MP's to vote on behalf of absent colleagues. However, the proposed format was found to be technically flawed and vulnerable to abuses and the technologies were not put to use.

A bill on introducing voting of lawmakers with help of a touch-sensitive key was not passed in mid-March 2011.

On 6 December 2012 the Parliament of Ukraine amended the Regulation (Article 37), which require MPs to register in person to attend meetings of Parliament, to vote and to do it in person. According to the law, before the opening of each session of Parliament shall be registered MPs personally based identification MP and handwritten signatures. In the boardroom deputy recorded through the e-voting system "Rada", so that rules out the registration deputy in his stead another person.

From the earliest days of the Verkhovna Rada of Ukraine at the 7th convocation (2012–2014) opposition faction in the Verkhovna Rada of Ukraine — "Batkivshchyna", the Ukrainian Democratic Alliance for Reform, VO "Svoboda", made a series of coordinated measures to cease "button pushing" by the faction of the Party of Regions.

February 5, 2013, deputies from the opposition blocked the rostrum. A representative of the "UDAR" came to the session in the red sweater with the words "Vote personally". Simultaneously the faction VO "Svoboda" filed a bill on criminalizing voting for others in the legislature. This document provided penalties for deputies who vote this way of imprisonment from 5 to 8 years.

MP, member of the "Batkivshchyna" Yuriy Odarchenko sued suit against Verkhovna Rada of Ukraine with the requirement to enter personal vote and cancel resolutions passed in violation of the regulations. MP calls implement electronic voting, which makes it impossible to register and vote one deputy instead of another, and to recognize the illegal and cancel the acts of the Verkhovna Rada, which were adopted in the period from December 13, 2012 to January 11, 2013 Lawsuit filed to the Supreme Administrative Court of Ukraine, February 5, 2013.

In addition, the European Court of Human Rights in January 2013 decision in the case "Alexander Volkov v. Ukraine," in which the judge found that the vote in the Verkhovna Rada of Ukraine in violation of the established procedure against European standards.

On 22 February, 2013, procedural measures were implemented to prevent multiple voting. Voting for other deputies became prohibited by law. This did not stop "piano-voting" from being rampant in Ukraine. In July 2013 the de facto Chief Whip of the Party of Regions Mykhailo Chechetov defended "piano-voting" by claiming "What matters is that decisions that the country needs get passed."

After the 2014 Euromaidan Revolution the new political climate demanded action against multi-voting. A tender was announced for a new parliamentary voting system, but no funding was ever allocated.

Following Volodymyr Zelensky’s elections wins in the 2019 Ukrainian presidential election and the 2019 Ukrainian parliamentary election the piano-voting issue once more began to attract attention. In December 2019 (due to the initiative of the Servant of the People party) "button pushing" was made punishable by a fine of ₴3,000-5,000. According to Peter Dickinson of the Atlantic Council (in March 2021) this fine "had failed to produce a flurry of prosecutions and had little discernible impact on actual instances of multiple voting in parliament."

The first attempt to hold an MP legally accountable for "piano-voting" was announced by Prosecutor General of Ukraine Iryna Venediktova on 12 February 2021.

On 2 March 2021 sensor technologies, that used (the) equipment already installed in 2008, were put to use in the Ukrainian parliament that technically made it impossible for MP's to vote on behalf of absent colleagues; since they need now to use both their hands for a single vote. In order to cast their vote, MPs must activate the sensor with one hand while voting with the other. MPs must keep the sensor activated throughout the duration of the voting period, thereby preventing them from voting on behalf of neighboring MPs.

Examples 
Over the years various deputies have stated that although they could not take part in votes, nevertheless their votes were registered in parliament. In April 2011, a vote of a deputy was registered although the man had died four days before the voting. Deputy (for Party of Regions) from 2006 until 2012 Rinat Akhmetov, was seen in the Verkhovna Rada building only once in the course of his five-year parliamentary membership — while his voting card was used in hundreds of votes.

With the use of "button pushing" voting in the Verkhovna Rada were adopted:
 The changes to the Constitution of Ukraine, which established the date of presidential elections in Ukraine.
 The Law of Ukraine "On measures to ensure the legislative reform of the pension system".
 The 2012 bill  (Actually voted 172 deputies, not 234, as officially announced).
 A new Criminal Procedural Code of Ukraine (adopted by 50 MPs instead  226) in 2012.
 The year 2013 marked the appointment of Ihor Sorkin as the new head of the National Bank of Ukraine.
In December 2020 Voice claimed that two deputies not present in the Verkhovna Rada building voted for the appointment of Serhiy Shkarlet as Minister of Education and Science (who was appointment with exactly the 226 required votes).

Legal analysis of violations of the law 

On the criminal nature of voting for another in the Ukrainian parliament by the analysis of provisions which regulated the legislative procedure.
Personal vote required by the Constitution of Ukraine, Article 84: "Voting at meetings of the Verkhovna Rada of Ukraine made deputy of Ukraine in person".

The presence and direct participation in meetings of the deputy of the Verkhovna Rada of Ukraine is not a matter of free decision MPs, and under paragraph 3 first part of the 24th article of the law ""About the Status of the People's Deputy of Ukraine" - is his duty.

However, today the legislation also provides liability for card use another MP (including duplicate) for registration and voting by electronic system (voting for someone else's card), as well as unauthorized intervention in the electronic voting system of the Verkhovna Rada of Ukraine and issuance of duplicate voting cards without the consent of the MP.

See also 
 People's Deputy of Ukraine
 Verkhovna Rada
 Party switching

Notes

References 

Verkhovna Rada
Political terminology
Corruption in Ukraine
Ukrainian words and phrases
Ukrainian slang